Ginataang mais is a Filipino sweet corn and rice gruel. It is also known as lugaw na mais (Kapampangan: lelut mais). It is a type of dessert lugaw and ginataan. It is eaten warm in colder months, but can also be eaten cold during summer. Ginataang mais means "corn in coconut milk" in Filipino.

Ginataang mais is made by boiling glutinous rice (malagkit) until almost done. Sweet corn, coconut milk (gata), and sugar are then added and the heat lowered shortly before the rice is fully cooked. In some recipes, coconut milk is added after cooking. Evaporated milk can also be used in place of coconut milk. Other ingredients may also be added, like latik (coconut caramel), pinipig (pounded young rice kernels), jackfruit, fresh grated coconut, butter, and vanilla.

See also
Binaki
Binatog
Ginataang munggo
List of maize dishes
Maíz con hielo
Pozole

References

Maize dishes
Philippine desserts
Foods containing coconut
Rice dishes
Philippine rice dishes
Vegetarian dishes of the Philippines